The People's Alliance (PA) is a progressive grassroots consumer watchdog organization in Durham, NC. It comprises three legally separate organizational entities: The People's Alliance, 501c(4) led by a steering committee, founded in 1975; The People's Alliance Fund, 501c(3) led by a board of directors, established in 1980; and The People's Alliance PAC – a political action committee established in 1982. The group participates and funds local initiatives, particularly to help low-income families obtain access to quality education, housing, and transportation.

History 
The People's Alliance (PA) was founded in October 1975. The founding members were activists, participants, and leaders in many political movements while in college in the 1960s and early 1970s. In 1978, members were typically white college graduates in their mid-20s to mid-30s working in white collar jobs. Many had actively opposed the Vietnam War and participated in the civil rights movement and women's equality and ecology movements. From the beginning, PA volunteers donated many hours of personal time to the organization.

Accomplishments 
The PA sponsors public and community forums and works with other grassroots organizations such as the Durham Committee on the Affairs of Black People to jointly fund campaigns. Since its founding in 1975, PA has an extensive catalog of accomplishments.

1970s 
In 1959, a 10-mile limited-access project called the East-West Expressway appeared on NCDOT thoroughfare plans. Construction began in 1967 on the first segment of the Expressway.  The first segment of the project demolished the historically African-American neighborhood of Hayti.  By the early 1970s, about half of the East-West Expressway had been constructed.  The next segment of the expressway was directed at another historically African-American neighborhood centered around Crest Street in the 100-year-old community of Hickstown.

The PA members recognized the opportunity to fight simultaneously for a number of political values – racial justice, interracial cooperation, anti-suburbanization, energy conservation, and environmental protection. With the help of PA members, the Crest Street Community Council (CSCC) was formed in 1975 to oppose the segment of expressway that would demolish the neighborhood.  In 1977, with guidance from the PA, the CSCC was able to obtain assistance from the North-Central Legal Assistance Program. The involvement of the PA through the expressway negotiations (1975–1986) helped all involved parties come to a successful resolution.

Michael D. Calhoun, the Legal Aid attorney for the CSCC, argued a case before the US Supreme Court regarding the payment of legal fees accrued during the negotiations. The case was decided on November 4, 1986, in favor of the CSCC. In 1992, the final segment of the East-West Expressway (also known as the Durham Freeway) was completed.

1980s and 1990s 
The PA was actively involved in a variety of causes, including taxation, elections, environment, housing, water/wastes/hazards, racial, civil and gender rights, education, and schools.

2000s 
A successful bond referendum in 1996 led to the 2008 construction of a transit station on West Chapel Hill Street across the street from the Amtrak train station that serves taxis and local, regional, and national buses.

In 2009, PA was engaged with two separate issues over Jordan Lake. One involved re-delineation of the lake boundary by a private developer who stood to gain financially from the change and the second concerned water quality in the lake.  PA successfully advocated for the passage of state legislation H239 "Restore Water Quality in Jordan Reservoir".

The PA fought to prevent electronic digital billboards from cropping up along the Durham Freeway and Interstates 40 and 85.

2014 committees 
Several PA committees were active in 2014. The Voter Empowerment Committee built a coalition to educate citizens in Durham and surrounding areas about voting changes. The Economic Inequality Committee focused on income inequality by developing a plan for a voluntary living wage campaign. After almost a decade of PA advocating to the DPS School Board and administration, a significant expansion of the teacher mentoring and principal leadership training programs finally took place. The Housing Committee advocates continued to fight for affordable and supportive housing near public transit.

The PA supports the Southern Coalition, Durham NAACP, and Fostering Alternative Drug Enforcement (FADE) in questioning racial profiling by Durham Police. Their five policy recommendations were designed to end disparities and make the DPD more accountable, ensuring that civil rights are respected.
 Implement a mandatory written consent-to-search policy for all vehicle searches
 Make marijuana enforcement the Durham Police Department's lowest law enforcement priority
 Implement a policy requiring mandatory periodic review of officer stop data
 Reform and strengthen the Durham Civilian Police Review Board
 Mandate that the Durham Police Department participate in formal racial equity training
These recommendations came into effect on October 1, 2014.

2015 Action Teams 
Economic Inequality advocates for policies that ensure that all Durham residents have access to high-quality jobs that pay a living wage with benefits and the opportunity to acquire and make use of productive assets. The Education Team works to support a unified public education system for Durham families. The Coalition for Affordable Housing and Transit advocates for residents of all incomes so they can afford to live near rail transit stations and bus hubs in Durham.

Public Office PA members 
These People's Alliance members have held public office:
 Diane Catotti (Durham City Council)
 Don Moffitt (Durham City Council)
 Eddie Davis (Durham City Council)
 Frank Hyman (Durham City Council)
 Lanier Fonvielle-Blum (Durham City Council)
 Lorisa Seibel (Durham City Council)
 Mike Woodard (Durham City Council/NC State Senate)
 Paul Luebke (NC State House of Representatives)
 Steve Schewel (Durham School Board, Durham City Council, Mayor)
 Wendy Jacobs (Durham County Commission)
 Wib Gulley (Durham Mayor, NC State Senate)

Longtime Durham Mayor Bill Bell retired in 2017. Steve Schewel was elected as the new mayor in the November 2017 elections

People's Alliance Fund 
The 501c(3) fund financially supports progressive educational and research activities in Durham and other North Carolina communities. They provide microgrants to progressive organizations needing one-time assistance for meetings, supplies, and educational materials. Several conferences and initiatives have received funding.

The Southern Anti-Racism Network (SARN) Ella Baker Tour (2008) was a tour by 1960s veterans of the Student Nonviolent Coordinating Committee. The tour included a stop in Durham for events at North Carolina Central University and Duke University. Five scholarships distributed through the Southern Anti-Racism Network for low-income Durham residents to participate in the One Nation Working Together march on Washington in October 2010. The march was organized by a broad coalition of labor, civil rights, and other progressive organizations.

The WNCU-FM "Keep It Kool" Project (2012) was an emergency project by the nonprofit radio station at North Carolina Central University in Durham so that they could purchase and install new air conditioning for the station's failing transmitter, allowing it to run at full capacity during the hot summer of 2012. For the People's Alliance Forum on Economic Inequality and the Economy (2013), distinguished local academics and activists discussed the crisis of income inequality in North Carolina and issues related to poverty and jobs. Participants included Gene Nichol of the University of North Carolina School of Law, Rob Schofield of NC Policy Watch, Sandy Darity of the Sanford School of Public Policy, and Jeff Ward of the Duke University Law School.

References 

Political organizations based in North America
1975 establishments in North Carolina
Organizations based in Durham, North Carolina
Organizations established in 1975